Left of Galicia (EdeG) was a political party in Galicia, Spain, led by Anxo Guerreiro and active between 1998 and 2002.

History
In 1997 a sector of United Left of Galicia, led by the General coordinator Anxo Guerreiro (supported from Madrid by the Democratic Party of the New Left), decided to form a coalition with the Socialists' Party of Galicia (PSdeG-PSOE) in the 1997 Galician elections, against the decisions of the national conference. Another sector was against that decision, and run with their own lists, and with the support of the federal United Left.

Left of Galicia won two seats (held by Miguel Anxo Guerreiro and Xosé Manuel Pazos). The results of the leftist coalition, however, were very disappointing. Altogether the coalition only obtained 15 seats (behind both the People's Party of Galicia and the Galician Nationalist Bloc). In the 1999 local elections the party run in various municipalities, gaining 10 local councillors.

In the 2001 Galician elections EdG only gained 5,001 (0.33%) votes, losing both seats. The party would disappear soon after.

See also
United Left of Galicia
Democratic Party of the New Left

References

1998 establishments in Spain
2002 disestablishments in Spain
Defunct political party alliances in Spain
Defunct socialist parties in Galicia (Spain)
Political parties established in 1998